The Lions of Sunna Brigade is a Free Syrian Army group fighting under the banner of the Southern Front. It joined the Hawks of the South coalition on 27 December 2014.

See also
List of armed groups in the Syrian Civil War

References

Anti-government factions of the Syrian civil war
Military units and formations established in 2014